Élie Barnavi (born 1946) is an Israeli historian and diplomat, who was the Israeli ambassador to France between 2000 and 2002. Born in Bucharest he moved as a child to Tel Aviv, Israel. He authored some fifteen books on France and Europe in the turmoil of the Religious Wars and on the contemporary history of Israel and of the Jewish people. He published numerous studies in professional journals in Europe, the US and Canada, as well as political articles in the Israeli and European press.

Biography 
Born in Bucharest, Romania, Barnavi emigrated as a child to Tel Aviv and became an Israeli citizen. He has degrees in history, and in political science from Tel Aviv University (TAU), and received his PhD in modern history from the University of Paris in 1971, after which he was appointed professor of modern Western history at TAU, where he headed the Department of General History and the Center for International Studies. He became the science director of the Museum of Europe in Brussels in 1998, and was the Israeli ambassador to France between 2000 and 2002, after which he resumed teaching at TAU and returned to his work at the museum.

Barnavi is an advocate for peace in the Israeli–Palestinian conflict, and for the creation of a Palestinian state. He is a member of the Peace Now movement and the left-wing Meretz party. In June 2008 he wrote an article in Marianne magazine regarding the Muhammad al-Durrah incident, which involved a 12-year-old Palestinian boy who was supposedly shot dead. He criticised the actions of Talal Abu Rahma—the Palestinian cameraman freelancing for France 2 who filmed the footage, calling him a "propagandist in the service of the Palestinian cause"—France 2, and Charles Enderlin, France 2's bureau chief in Israel; and called for an independent inquiry into the affair. Enderline replied that, given Barnavi's position as a former ambassador, a quick call to Shabak, Israel's internal security service, would have cleared up inaccuracies in his account. In 2010 he helped create JCall and supported its "Call for Reason" campaign which advocates the two-state solution.

Barnavi is friends with Jean Frydman, a member of the French Resistance, and successfully persuaded Frydman to write an autobiography after Romain Gary among others tried and failed. He has debated with Hubert Védrine, amongst others.

Barnavi has written several books on French and European history, including L’Europe Frigide ("Frigid Europe") (2008), in which he talks about how "Europe no longer incites passion in her citizens. She has lost her sex appeal, is no longer exciting or arousing curiosity, since everything has become bureaucratic." In 2010 he said the European Union was in decline relative to the United States and emerging countries.

References

Further reading 
 Gady, Alexandre. "Élie Barnavi : « Le socle de l'europe est chrétien »"  (Google Translate). Le Point. 17 January 2001. Retrieved 4 October 2010.
 "Elie Barnavi, historian and former Israeli ambassador to France". France 24. 17 October 2009. Retrieved 3 October 2010.
 "Europe fights declining power". The Straits Times. 10 February 2010. Retrieved 4 October 2010.
 Ayache, Charlotte. "Israël, un avenir compromis ?"  (Google Translate). Jerusalem Post. 28 April 2010. Retrieved 4 October 2010.
 Audétat, Michel. "Elie Barnavi: "Israël s’enferme dans une cage""  (Google Translate). L'Hebdo. 16 June 2010. Retrieved 9 October 2010.

External links 

1946 births
Living people
Romanian Jews
Tel Aviv University alumni
Israeli historians
Ambassadors of Israel to France
Israeli–Palestinian peace process
Museum directors
Romanian emigrants to Israel